Built starting in 1852, the Stagecoach Inn of Salado, Texas, is thought to be the oldest extant structure in the village.  The Inn was built as a stagecoach stop along the Chisholm Trail.  The simple, two-story wood-frame building is in a frontier vernacular style. The structure was extended several times in the 1940s and 1950s to serve as a restaurant.  The inn was listed on the National Register of Historic Places in 1983. The inn has also been a member of Historic Hotels of America, the official program of the National Trust for Historic Preservation, since 2018., although its current name with the organization is the "Shady Villa Hotel."

The nearby Salado Creek was designated a natural landmark in Texas in 1867.

See also

Stagecoach Inn of Chappell Hill, in Washington County
Fanthorp Inn State Historic Site, in Grimes County
National Register of Historic Places listings in Bell County, Texas
Recorded Texas Historic Landmarks in Bell County

References

External links

Hotels in Texas
Hotel buildings on the National Register of Historic Places in Texas
Stagecoach stops in the United States
Buildings and structures in Bell County, Texas
National Register of Historic Places in Bell County, Texas
Stagecoach stations on the National Register of Historic Places
Stagecoach stations in Texas
Transportation buildings and structures on the National Register of Historic Places in Texas
Recorded Texas Historic Landmarks
Historic Hotels of America